Chicoreus longicornis is a species of sea snail, a marine gastropod mollusk in the family Muricidae, the murex snails or rock snails.

Description
The length of the shell varies between 30 mm and 75 mm.

Distribution
This marine species occurs in the Indo-West Pacific and off Australia (Queensland)

References

 Wilson, B. R. & Gillett, K. (1974). Australian Shells. Illustrating and Describing 600 Species of Marine Gastropods from Australian Waters. A. H. & A. W. Reed.

Muricidae
Gastropods described in 1864